There are over 20,000 Grade II* listed buildings in England. This page is a list of these buildings in the district of City of Canterbury in Kent.

List of buildings

|}

Notes

External links

Lists of Grade II* listed buildings in Kent
Grade II* listed buildings in Kent